Sleeping in Class is the third mixtape by American rapper Casey Veggies. It was released on December 13, 2010, by Peas & Carrots International. A reissued deluxe edition of the mixtape was released on September 20, 2011, by Peas & Carrots International and Delicious Vinyl. The mixtape contains guest appearances from Dom Kennedy, Kendrick Lamar, Tyler, the Creator, Mac Miller, Skye Townsend, and Mann, among others.

Track listing

Critical reception 

The album received positive reviews from music critics. His talent was praised for the album. Schmidty of BoxCarFlow said "Sleeping In Class showcases an enormous talent with tremendous promise." While iHipHop wrote "Casey brings a much more conventional flow and attitude to his work." His lyrical delivery was praised as iHiphop wrote "He works clever turns of phrase, setting up decent punch lines and flowing with a decent amount of energy."

In addition he was praised for his maturity. Undergroundhiphop wrote "Casey's ability to rap about the trials and tribulations of a young adult while ...appealing to an older crowd is what makes Casey Veggies one of the most promising freshmen on the west coast." While  Schmidty wrote "He delivers thoughts ... about life, school, relationships, his hometown of Inglewood and trying to make a name for himself." The production was fairly praised. While iHipHop wrote "The strong point of the album though has to be the production, with more than a few songs on here that go pretty hard." For one particular song they wrote "30,000” has heavy drums and an alien sounding synth line that sounds like a spaceship’s theft deterrence alarm." Schmidty wrote "Production-wise, there are some truly impressive beats from a slew of relatively unknown producers, with exception of a few names."

The guest appearances were also acclaimed. Stone of hiphopspeakeasy said "He also got some interesting features on this album." He was praised for straying away from typical rap themes: Grounded in a reality that some of his peers reject, Casey never tries to exaggerate his life’s journey into an ... adventure full of drugs, murder, rape and dinosaurs wrote Schmidty of iHipHop. Then, his potential was remarked about the album. iHipHop wrote "Sleeping In Class may not be Casey’s defining moment, but it could be a key character builder leading up to that moment." Schmidty wrote " There is no denying that this kid’s got some serious potential."

References

External links
 Sleeping in Class (Deluxe Edition) lyrics
 Casey Veggies Website

2011 albums
Albums produced by Tyler, the Creator
Albums produced by Hit-Boy
Reissue albums
Casey Veggies albums